The Women's Under-17 National League is the under-17 division of the Women's National League and the first under-age national league in women's football.

The league was launched in 2018 with 11 clubs. Republic of Ireland internationals Heather Payne and Isibeal Atkinson, Tom Dennigan, Continental Tyres General Sales Manager and FAI Director of Competitions Fran Gavin helped launch the league in July 2018 at the FAI National Training Centre.

Format
The inaugural season consisted of 11 teams and began mid-late July 2018 with a truncated season with two groups. Competing in Group One were: Athlone Town, Donegal League, Peamount United, Shelbourne, Sligo Rovers and Galway Women's and competing in Group Two were: Cork City, Greystones, Limerick, UCD Waves, and Wexford Youths. 
Following the conclusion of the 10 rounds of fixtures, the top two teams from each group played in play-off mode the semi-finals and final to decide the winner.

In December 2018, the Women's National League Committee has accepted an expression of interest to compete in the 2019 Under-17 Women's National League season from Bohemian FC. With the addition of Bohemians, the League now consists of 12 teams, with six teams competing in two groups before the final stage of the competition. The 2019 season began on the weekend ending Sunday, April 7 and there has also been a WU17 League Cup introduced along with a Shield competition in the finals stage of the competition.

The 2020 season saw the introduction of Bray Wanderers, Carlow-Kilkenny, and Shamrock Rovers to the Women's U17 League which now consists of 15 teams. The format of 2 groups before the final stage of the competition was initially maintained. The start of the season fell victim to the lockdown measurements introduced by the government to tackle the COVID-19 pandemic. A new format and start date were published on 23 July 2020 after the phased reopening of the country. The league would now be split into 3 groups of 5 teams each and the top two teams in each group and the two best third-placed teams will qualify for the quarter-finals with the competition then changing to a knock-out format.

Teams

Timeline

Under 17 National League Champions

Under 17 National League Cup Champions

Under 17 Player of the Year

References

Women's association football in the Republic of Ireland
Sports leagues established in 2018
2018 establishments in Ireland
Women's association football leagues in the Republic of Ireland
Ireland
Youth association football in the Republic of Ireland